Kristo Mangelsoo (born 6 March 1993) is a former Estonian professional basketball player.

Mangelsoo started playing basketball in Viljandi and joined Kalev/Cramo when he was 17. He made his debut in the club in 2012.
Mangelsoo decided to retire from basketball in 2014.

References

External links
Profile at Eurobasket
Profile at VTB United League

1993 births
Living people
BC Kalev/Cramo players
Estonian men's basketball players
Small forwards